Dávid Bartimej Tencer, OFMCap (born 18 May 1963) is a Slovakian prelate of the Roman Catholic Church and the current bishop of the Diocese of Reykjavík.

Early life and priesthood
Tencer was born on 18 May 1963 in Nová Baňa, Czechoslovakia (modern-day Slovakia). On 15 June 1986, Dávid Tencer received the sacrament of priestly ordination for the Roman Catholic Diocese of Banská Bystrica. In 1990, Tencer entered into the Order of the Capuchins, and on 28 August 1994 he made his perpetual profession. He then served as a parish administrator in Holíč. In 1996, he was transferred to Rat icov vrch at Hriňova. Between 2001 and 2004 he taught homiletics and spiritual theology in the seminary in Badin. As the superior of the fraternity in Žilina from 2003 until 2004 he was teaching spiritual theology in the Institute of Saint Thomas of Aquin in Žilina.

He came to Iceland in 2004 and was appointed parish priest at the Stella Maris Parish in Reykjavik. In 2007, he was made parish priest of the St. Thorlak Church in Reyðarfjörður, He also served on the Presbyteral Council and on the Diocese's Collegium Consultorum.

Episcopate
On 18 September 2015, Pope Francis appointed him bishop of Reykjavík. On October 31, 2015, his predecessor, Pierre Bürcher, ordained him bishop in Reykjavík. His co-consecrators were the apostolic nuncio in Iceland, archbishop Henryk Józef Nowacki, and the bishop of Žilina, Tomáš Galis.

On 17 June 2017 a new Catholic Church was consecrated in Reyðarfjördur in a ceremony led by Tencer. The church building was a gift from the Slovak Catholic Church. The church was built from wood in Slovakia, disassembled and shipped to Reyðarfjördur where it was re-assembled. Robert Fico, the Prime Minister of Slovakia, attended the consecration.

References

External links
 http://www.catholic-hierarchy.org/bishop/btencer.html 

1963 births
Living people
Capuchin bishops
Slovak Roman Catholic bishops
Roman Catholic bishops of Reykjavík
People from Nová Baňa
People from Žarnovica District
21st-century Roman Catholic bishops in Iceland
Icelandic people of Slovak descent